Haliotis thailandis is a species of sea snail, a marine gastropod mollusk in the family Haliotidae, the abalones.

Description

Distribution
This species has been found in the Andaman Sea and the seas around the Philippines

References

External links

thailandis
Gastropods described in 2001